
Daubensee is a lake at Gemmi Pass in Valais, Switzerland. It is the site of the annual Shepherd Festival held on the last Sunday in July.

See also
List of lakes of Switzerland
List of mountain lakes of Switzerland

External links

Lakes of Valais